Smyrna stitch is a form of cross stitch used in needlepoint. It was popular during the Victorian period and again, later, in the 1950s and 1960s. It comprises a cross stitch worked over two, or more, threads with a straight cross stitch worked over the top.

Thérèse de Dilmont in the Encyclopedia of Needlework gives the following description:
Make a plain cross stitch over four threads, each way, and then over that, another cross stitch, standing upright. The same stitch can be made over six or seven threads; if you work over more than four threads, it follows that you increase the number of stitches accordingly.

Notes

References
 Gordon, Jill Take Up Needlepoint 1994 London, Merehurst  
 de Dilmont, Thérèse Encyclopedia of Needlework 1884, accessed 16 December 2010

Embroidery stitches